Tetragalacturonic acid hydroxymethylester is a local antihemorrhagic. It is derived from apple pectin. It is not used clinically, but research in the 1970s suggests that pectin and analogues may inhibit fibrinolysis in vitro.

References

Tetrasaccharides